Davit Modzmanashvili (born 13 July 1986) is a heavyweight freestyle wrestler from Georgia who since 2017 competes for Uzbekistan. He won a silver medal for Georgia at the 2012 Olympics and placed third at the 2011 World Championships. 

After winning a European title in 2008, Modzmanashvili tested positive for a banned substance. He was stripped of his gold medal and received a two-year suspension.

In January 2019, Modzmanashvili tested positive for a prohibited substance of dehydrochlormethyltestosterone after stored samples from the 2012 Olympics were re-analysed. He was subsequently stripped of his Olympic silver medal and banned for 6 years.

References

External links
 

1986 births
Living people
Wrestlers at the 2012 Summer Olympics
Male sport wrestlers from Georgia (country)
Olympic wrestlers of Georgia (country)
World Wrestling Championships medalists
Wrestlers at the 2018 Asian Games
Medalists at the 2018 Asian Games
Asian Games bronze medalists for Uzbekistan
Asian Games medalists in wrestling
Doping cases in wrestling
Competitors stripped of Summer Olympics medals
Sportspeople from Georgia (country) in doping cases
Uzbekistani people of Georgian descent
Asian Wrestling Championships medalists